The internal conflict in Peru is an ongoing armed conflict between the Government of Peru and the Maoist guerilla group Shining Path. The conflict began on 17 May 1980, and from 1982 to 1997 the Túpac Amaru Revolutionary Movement waged its own insurgency as a Marxist–Leninist rival to the Shining Path. It is estimated that there have been between 50,000 and 70,000 deaths, making it the bloodiest war in Peruvian history, since the European colonization of the country.

The high death toll includes many civilian casualties, due to deliberate targeting by many factions. Since 2000, the number of deaths has dropped significantly and recently the conflict has become dormant. There were low-level resurgences of violence in 2002 and 2014 when conflict erupted between the Peruvian Army and guerrilla remnants in the Valle de los Ríos Apurímac, Ene y Mantaro region. The conflict has lasted for over 40 years, making it the second longest internal conflict in the history of Latin America, after the Colombian conflict.

Background

The first guerrilla outbreaks arose in Peru in the early 1960s, during the Moderate Civil Reform, when the Revolutionary Left Movement (MIR), a guerrilla group founded and led by Luis de la Puente Uceda, began its first attacks in against the Peruvian State in 1962. However, despite their training in Fidel Castro's Cuba, the members of the MIR often were in an unstable state, as they were often based in the Amazon. As a result, its members were easily killed by the police and the armed forces. During these counterattacks, their leader and founder was killed and the group eventually collapses completely by 1965. Another guerrilla group that also emerged simultaneously was the National Liberation Army (ELN) led by Juan Pablo Chang Navarro and trained by Cuba. It was made up of some former members of the MIR and other people who were recruited. However, this organization suffered the same fate as the MIR since many of its members were infected with leishmaniasis. As a result, the armed forces killed its members. The ELN received military training in Cuba and operated from 1962 to 1965. After its dismantling, its main leaders fled to Bolivia where they would fight alongside Che Guevara in the Ñancahuazú Guerrilla, where they would be assassinated while trying to establish a guerrilla focus in the Andes.

Prior to the conflict, Peru had undergone a series of coups with frequent switches between political parties and ideologies. On 2 October 1968, General Juan Velasco Alvarado staged a military coup and became Peru's 56th president under the administration of the Revolutionary Government of the Armed Forces,   left-leaning military dictatorship. Following a period of widespread poverty and unemployment, Velasco himself was overthrown in a bloodless military coup on 29 August 1975. He was replaced by Francisco Morales Bermúdez as the new President of Peru.

Morales announced that his rule would provide a "Second Phase" to the previous administration, which would bring political and economic reforms. However, he was unsuccessful in delivering these promises, and in 1978, a Constitutional Assembly was created to replace Peru's 1933 Constitution. Morales then proclaimed that national elections would be held by 1980. Elections were held for the Constituent Assembly on 18 June 1978, whilst martial law was imposed on 6 January 1979. The Assembly approved the new constitution in July 1979. On 18 May 1980, Fernando Belaúnde Terry was elected president. Between February 1966 and July 1980 approximately 500 people died of political violence.

Many affiliated with Peru's Communist Party had opposed the creation of the new constitution and formed the extremist organization known as the PCP. This ultimately led to the emergence of internal conflict, with the first attacks taking place a day before the elections. Despite this, national elections continued and Fernando Belaúnde Terry was elected as the 58th President of Peru in 1980. Terry had already served as the country's 55th president prior to Velasco's coup in 1968.

The Shining Path 

During the governments of Velasco and Morales, the Shining Path had been organized as a Maoist political group formed in 1970 by Abimael Guzmán, a communist professor of philosophy at the San Cristóbal of Huamanga University. Guzmán had been inspired by the Chinese Cultural Revolution which he had witnessed first-hand during a trip to China. Shining Path members engaged in street fights with members of other political groups and painted graffiti encouraging an "armed struggle" against the Peruvian state.

In June 1979, demonstrations for free education were severely repressed by the army: 18 people were killed according to official figures, but non-governmental estimates suggest several dozen deaths. This event led to a radicalization of political protests in the countryside and the outbreak of the PCP's terrorist actions.

Course of the conflict

Outbreak of hostilities (1980–1982) 
When Peru's military government allowed elections for the first time in 1980, the Communist Party of Peru was one of the few leftist political groups that declined to take part. They opted instead to launch guerrilla warfare actions against the state in the province of Ayacucho. On 17 May 1980—the eve of the presidential elections—members of the Shining Path burned ballot boxes in the town of Chuschi, Ayacucho.  The perpetrators were quickly caught and additional ballots were brought in to replace the burned ballots; the elections proceeded without any further incidents. The incident received very little attention in the Peruvian press. A few days later, on 13 June, a group of young people belonging to the "generated organization" Movement of Labourers y Workers Clasistas (MOTC) carried out an attack on the Municipality of San Martín de Porres in Lima with Molotov cocktails commemorating the Chuschi incident.

The Shining Path opted to fight in the manner advocated by Mao Zedong. They would open up "guerrilla zones" in which their guerrillas could operate and drive government forces out of these zones to create "liberated zones". These zones would then be used to support new guerrilla zones until the entire country was essentially a unified "liberated zone". There is some disagreement among scholars about the extent of Maoist influence on the PCP, but the majority of scholars consider the Shining Path to be a violent Maoist organization. One of the factors contributing to support for this view among scholars is that PCP's economic and political base were located primarily in rural areas and they sought to build up their influence in these areas.

On 3 December 1982, the Communist Party of Peru officially formed an armed wing known as the "People's Guerrilla Army".

The Peruvian guerrillas were peculiar in that they had a high proportion of women, 50 per cent of the combatants and 40 per cent of the commanders were women.

Gradually, the Shining Path carried out more violent attacks on the Peruvian National Police and the government in Lima, signaling a growing crisis in the Andes. In 1982, Fernando Belaúnde Terry declared a state of emergency and ordered the Armed Forces to fight the Shining Path. Constitutional rights were suspended for 60 days in the provinces of Huamanga, Huanta, Cangallo, La Mar and Víctor Fajardo. Later, the Armed Forces would create the Ayacucho emergency zone, in which military power was superior to civilian power and many constitutional rights were suspended.

Túpac Amaru Revolutionary Movement 

In 1982, the Túpac Amaru Revolutionary Movement (MRTA) launched its own guerrilla war against the Peruvian state. The group had been formed by remnants of the Movement of the Revolutionary Left and identified with Castroite guerrilla movements in other parts of Latin America. The MRTA used techniques that were more traditional to Latin American leftist organizations, like wearing uniforms, claiming to fight for true democracy, and accusations of human rights abuses by the state; in contrast, the Shining Path did not wear uniforms, nor care for electoral processes.

During the conflict, the MRTA and the Shining Path engaged in combat with each other. The MRTA only played a small part in the overall conflict, being declared by the Truth and Reconciliation Commission to have been responsible for 1.5 percent of casualties accumulated throughout the conflict. At its height, the MRTA was believed to have consisted of only a few hundred members.

Government response (1981) 
Gradually, the Shining Path committed more and more violent attacks on the National Police of Peru until the Lima-based government could no longer ignore the growing crisis.  In 1981, President Fernando Belaúnde Terry declared a state of emergency and ordered that the Peruvian Armed Forces fight Shining Path.  Constitutional rights were suspended for 60 days in the Huamanga, Huanta, Cangallo, La Mar, and the Víctor Fajardo Provinces.  Later, the Armed Forces created the Ayacucho Emergency Zone, where military law superseded civilian law.  The military committed many human right violations in the area where it had political control, including the infamous Accomarca massacre.  Scores of peasant farmers were massacred by the armed forces.  A special US-trained "counter terrorist" police battalion is known as the "Sinchis" became  notorious in the 1980s for their violations of human rights.

The PCP's reaction to the Peruvian government's use of the military in the conflict was to increase violent warfare in the countryside. Shining Path attacked police officers, soldiers, and civilians that it considered being "class enemies", often using gruesome methods of killing their victims.  These killings, along with Shining Path's disrespect for the culture of indigenous peasants, turned many civilians in the Sierra away from the group.

Shining Path massacres (1982–1989) 
Faced with a hostile population, Shining Path's guerrilla campaigns began to falter. In some areas, fearful, well-off peasants formed anti-Shining Path patrols called . They were generally poorly equipped despite donations of guns from the armed forces. The first reported attack was near Huata in January 1983, where some  killed 13 guerrillas. In February in Sacsamarca,  stabbed and killed the Shining Path commanders of that area. In March 1983,  brutally killed Olegario Curitomay, one of the commanders of the town of Lucanamarca. They took him to the town square, stoned him, stabbed him, set him on fire, and finally shot him. Shining Path responded by entering the province of Huancasancos and the towns of Yanaccollpa, Ataccara, Llacchua, Muylacruz, and Lucanamarca, where they killed 69 people. Other similar incidents followed, such as ones in Hauyllo, the Tambo District, and the La Mar Province. In the Ayacucho Department, Shining Path killed 47 peasants.

Additional massacres by Shining Path occurred, such as one in Marcas on 29 August 1985.

Administration of Alberto Fujimori (1990–2000) and decline
Under the administration of Alberto Fujimori, the state began its widespread use of intelligence agencies in the fight against Shining Path. Some atrocities were committed by the National Intelligence Service, notably the La Cantuta massacre, the Barrios Altos massacre and the Santa massacre. Under the government of Alberto Fujimori, the confrontation was waged mainly through bomb attacks and selective assassinations by the Shining Path. The government began to use death squads in order to combat and eliminate suspected communist sympathizers, including the Grupo Colina and Rodrigo Franco Command. These groups often committed human rights abuses throughout Peru. Fujimori's government also used the peasant rounds in order to combat the Shining Pat and the MRTA in the rural countryside.

Events such as the "Asháninka holocaust" perpetrated by the Shining Path also occurred at this stage. The Peruvian government began a massive crackdown on the Shining Path using unused methods. Military personnel were dispatched to areas dominated by the Shining Path, especially Ayacucho, to fight the rebels. Ayacucho, Huancavelica, Apurímac and Huánuco were declared emergency zones, allowing for some constitutional rights to be suspended in those areas.

On 5 April 1992, Fujimori made a self-coup with the aim of dissolving the opposition-controlled Congress of Peru and replace the Judiciary branch. The 1979 Constitution was abolished and a Constitutional crisis took place. Fujimori also announced that Peru would no longer be under the jurisdiction of the Inter-American Court of Human Rights.

Shining Path declared that it had reached "strategic equilibrium" and was ready to begin its final assault on the cities of Peru. In 1992, Shining Path set off a powerful bomb in the Miraflores District of Lima in what became known as the Tarata bombing. This was part of a larger bombing campaign to follow suit in Lima.

On 12 September 1992, Peruvian police captured Guzmán and several Shining Path leaders in an apartment above a dance studio in the Surquillo district of Lima. The police had been monitoring the apartment, as a number of suspected Shining Path militants had visited it.  An inspection of the garbage of the apartment produced empty tubes of a skin cream used to treat psoriasis, a condition that Guzmán was known to have. Shortly after the raid that captured Guzmán, most of the remaining Shining Path leadership fell as well. At the same time, Shining Path suffered military defeats to peasant self-defense organizations.

Guzmán's role as the leader of Shining Path was taken over by Óscar Ramírez, who himself was captured by Peruvian authorities in 1999. After Ramírez's capture, the group splintered, guerrilla activity diminished sharply and previous conditions returned to the areas where the Shining Path had been active. Some Shining Path and MRTA remnants managed to stage minor scale attacks, such as the January 1993 wave of attacks and political assassinations that occurred in the run-up to the municipal elections, which also targeted US interests; these included the bombing of two Coca-Cola plants on 22 January (by Shining Path); the RPG attack against the USIS Binational Center on 16 January; the bombing of a KFC restaurant on 21 January (both by the MRTA) and the car-bombing of the Peruvian headquarters of IBM on 28 January (by Shining Path). On 27 July 1993, Shining Path militants drove a car bomb into the US Embassy in Lima, which left extensive damage on the complex (worth some US$250,000) and nearby buildings.

As for the MRTA, its forces were decimated both by the Repentance Law and by the imprisonment of its main leaders; among them, its main leader Víctor Polay, who had escaped from prison in 1990 and was recaptured in 1992. In 1996, an armed commando of 14 members of the MRTA, led by Néstor Cerpa Cartolini, stormed the residence of the Japanese ambassador in Peru, beginning the crisis of 72 hostages that lasted 126 days. The MRTA demanded the release of 462 members of the insurgent group, imprisoned by the government to free the hostages, a demand emphatically rejected by the government. The crisis ended when the Peruvian armed forces recaptured the embassy in a military action called Operation Chavín de Huántar, which allowed the release of the hostages with the exception of Carlos Giusti Acuña, a member of the Supreme Court, who died in the exchange of shots with the subversive group. The final result was the death of the 14 subversive members, including their leader and two officers (Lieutenant Colonel Juan Valer Sandoval and Lieutenant Raúl Jiménez Chávez) who fell in combat; With this coup, the MRTA disappeared as an armed actor in the conflict.

Shining Path was confined to their former headquarters in the Peruvian jungle and continued smaller attacks against the military, like the one that occurred on 2 October 1999, when a Peruvian Army helicopter was shot down by Shining Path guerrillas near Satipo (killing 5) and stealing a PKM machine gun which was reportedly used in another attack against an Mi-17 in July 2003.

Despite Shining Path being mostly defeated, more than 25% of Peru's national territory remained under a state of emergency until early 2000.

Truth and Reconciliation Commission
Alberto Fujimori resigned the Presidency in 2000, but Congress declared him "morally unfit", installing the opposite congress member Valentín Paniagua into office. He rescinded Fujimori's announcement that Peru would leave the Inter-American Court of Human Rights and established a Truth and Reconciliation Commission (CVR) to investigate the conflict. The commission was headed by the President of Catholic University Salomón Lerner Febres. The Commission found in its 2003 Final Report that 69,280 people died or disappeared between 1980 and 2000 as a result of the armed conflict. A statistical analysis of the available data led the Truth and Reconciliation Commission to estimate that the Shining Path was responsible for the death or disappearance of 31,331 people, 45% of the total deaths and disappearances. According to a summary of the report by Human Rights Watch, "Shining Path... killed about half the victims, and roughly one-third died at the hands of government security forces... The commission attributed some of the other slayings to a smaller guerrilla group and local militias. The rest remain unattributed." According to its final report, 75% of the people who were either killed or disappeared spoke Quechua as their native language, despite the fact that the 1993 census found that only 20% of Peruvians speak Quechua or another indigenous language as their native language.

Nevertheless, the final report of the CVR was surrounded by controversy. It was criticized by almost all political parties (including former Presidents Fujimori, García and Paniagua), the military and the Catholic Church, which claimed that many of the Commission members were former members of extreme leftists movements and that the final report wrongfully portrayed Shining Path and the MRTA as "political parties" rather than as terrorist organizations, even though, for example, Shining Path has been clearly designated as a terrorist organization by the United States, the European Union, and Canada.

A 2019 study disputed the casualty figures from the Truth and Reconciliation Commission, estimating instead "a total of 48,000 killings, substantially lower than the TRC estimate" and concluding that "the Peruvian State accounts for a significantly larger share than the Shining Path."

Reemergence in the 21st century (2002–present)

Since 2002, there have been a number of incidents relating to internal conflict within Peru. On 20 March 2002, a car bomb exploded at "El Polo," a mall in a wealthy district of Lima near the U.S. embassy. On 9 June 2003, a Shining Path group attacked a camp in Ayacucho, and took 68 employees of the Argentine company Techint and three police guards hostage. The hostages worked at the Camisea gas pipeline project that takes natural gas from Cuzco to Lima. According to sources from Peru's Interior Ministry, the hostage-takers asked for a sizable ransom to free the hostages. Two days later, after a rapid military response, the hostage-takers abandoned the hostages. According to some sources, the company paid the ransom.

In 2015, the U.S. Treasury Department declared the Shining Path a narco-terrorist organization engaged in the taxing of production, processing, and transport, of cocaine. The allegations of Shining Path drug trafficking had been made by the Peruvian government prior to the U.S. decree. This decree froze all Shining Path financial assets in the United States. U.S. Treasury official John Smith stated that the decree would help "the government of Peru's efforts to actively combat the group".

Timeline
 13 October 2006 – Abimael Guzmán, main leader and founder of Shining Path was sentenced to life in prison for terrorism charges.
 22 May 2007 – Peruvian police arrested 2 Shining Path members in the town of Churcampa, Huancavelica province.
 27 May 2007, the 27th anniversary of the Shining Path's first attack against the Peruvian state, a homemade bomb in a backpack was set off in a market in the southern Peruvian city of Juliaca, killing six and wounding 48. Because of the timing of the attack, the Shining Path is suspected by the Peruvian authorities of holding responsibility.
 20 September 2007 – Peruvian police arrested 3 Shining Path insurgents in the city of Huancayo, Junín province.
 25 March 2008 – Shining Path rebels killed a police officer and wounded 11, while they were performing patrol duty.
 15 October 2008 – Shining Path insurgents attacked an army patrol, killing 2 and wounding 5.
 20 October 2008 – a group of 30 to 50 Shining Path insurgents entered a camp set up by the mining company Doe Run. After delivering a short Maoist propaganda speech, before leaving, the militants stole communications equipment and food.
 October 2008 – In Huancavelica province, the Shining Path engaged military and civil convoy with explosives and firearms, demonstrating their continued ability to strike and inflict casualties on targets. The clash resulted in the death of 12 soldiers and two to seven civilians.
 9 April 2009 – Shining Path militants ambushed and killed 13 Peruvian soldiers in the Apurímac and Ene river valleys in Ayacucho.
 26 August 2009 – Two soldiers were killed in two separate incidents outside San Antonio de Carrizales, in the Huancayo Province.
 31 August 2009 – Three soldiers were wounded in an encounter with Shinign Path members, in the San Antonio de Carrizales, in the Huancayo Province.
 2 September 2009 – Shining Path militants shot down a Peruvian Air Force Mi-17 helicopter, later killing the two pilots with small arms fire.
 12 February 2012 – Shining Path leader Comrade Artemio was captured by a combined force of the Peruvian Army and the Police. President Ollanta Humala said that he would now step up the fight against the other remaining band of Shining Path rebels in the Ene-Apurímac valley.
 27 April 2012 – Shining Path militants killed 3 soldiers and wounded 2 others in the aftermath of an ambush.
 9 May 2012 – A Peruvian Police Mil Mi-17 helicopter crashed after an Shining Path sniper killed a police helicopter pilot during a hostage rescue operation in the Peruvian Amazon, 4 soldiers were also wounded in the crash. The operation started when Shining Path took up to 40 hostages, demanding a $10 million ransom, 1500 soldiers were deployed into the abduction area in order to participate in the operation
 May 2012 – It was reported that since 2008, 71 security forces personnel had been killed and 59 wounded by Shining Path ambushes in the VRAE region.
 11 August 2013 – The Peruvian army killed three Shining Path rebels, including senior commander Comrade Alipio.
 8 November 2013 – Peruvian Army General Cesar Diaz was removed from the position of Chief of the Joint Command of Special Operations and the Intelligence Command in the VRAEM. The decision came in the aftermath of the 16 October 2003, aerial bombing of Mazangaro which killed one civilian and injured 4 others.
 February 2014 – The Shining Path were reported to have attacked a Transportadora de Gas del Peru natural gas work camp in Peru's Cusco region.
 10 April 2014 – Peruvian authorities arrested 24 people on charges of Shining Path affiliation.
 18 June 2014 – Security forces killed 3 and injured 1 Shining Path insurgents during an apartment raid in the Echarate region.
 5 October 2014 – 2 policemen were killed and at least 5 injured when they were attacked by Shining Path militants in the VRAEM region.
 14 October 2014 – One soldier was killed and 4 injured in the aftermath of an ambush conducted between Chalhuamayo and the town of San Francisco, VRAEM. A civilian was also injured in the attack.
 17 December 2014 – The garrison of the Llochegua army base, in Huanta province, successfully repelled a Shining Path attack, one soldier was wounded following the skirmish.
 9 April 2016 – Two soldiers and one civilian were killed, and 6 other soldiers were injured when militants believed to be part of the Shining Path group, hidden in the jungles of the Junin Region attacked a truck carrying soldiers to protect voting stations in Lima, as Presidential Elections were to be held the following day.
 2 August 2016 – The Joint Command of the Armed Forces reported that yesterday at 11 pm suspected terrorists attacked a military base in the Mazamari district, in the Valley of the Apurimac River, Ene, and Mantaro (abbreviated commonly VRAEM), leaving the balance of a wounded soldier.
 27 September 2016 – At least three people, one soldier, and two civilians were injured in a shooting, there is a detainee in Huancavelica.
 13 December 2016 – A policeman died during an operation in the town of Apachita in VRAEM region.
 14 December 2016 – Two policemen (another was seriously injured) and four narco-terrorists died after a clash in the VRAEM region, known for hosting remnants of Sendero Luminoso and the high traffic of drugs.
 12 March 2017 – Militants of Shining Path attacked a helicopter of the armed forces of Peru, the latter responded to the attack leaving as balance several wounded attackers.
 18 March 2017 – Three policemen were killed and another injured during an ambush in Ayacucho region.
 31 May 2017 – According to Channel N, it would be a narco-terrorist attack in which two members of the National Police of Peru were shot dead in the VRAEM region.
 21 July 2017 – Llochegua Clashes: An armed confrontation and attempted rescue rescued 10 policemen and a prosecutor injured in Llochegua, in the department of Ayacucho. A leader of a local armed group was arrested in the operation
 1 August 2017 – One soldier died and seven other rebels were wounded in an ambush in a clash between the army and remnants of Shining Path. In other incident in the same district at least one soldier was killed and other three were wounded.
 6 September 2017 – At least three police were shot dead by suspected militants at approximately 6 p.m. in the province of Churcampa, Huancavelica region.
 22 September 2017 – A military patrol and a group of Shining Path remnants clashed in a sector of the VRAEM in Ayacucho without causing injuries, reported the Joint Command of the Armed Forces. A policeman was killed and four injured. A guide was also injured and one went missing near the 116th kilometer of the Inter-Oceanic road, 15 minutes by motorcycle, in the section of Puerto Maldonado – Mazuko, Madre de Dios.
 7 June 2018 – Four policemen were killed in an ambush by terrorists in the Anco district of Churcampa province in the Huancavelica region of Peru.
 9 June 2018 – Víctor Quispe Palomino, nom de guerre "Comrade José", releases a statement declaring himself the leader of Shining Path. He announces the restructuring of the group as the Militarized Communist Party of Peru (MPCP), as well as its intention to carry out more attacks.
 11 June 2018 – A group of terrorists attacked a military base in the town of Mazángaro in the province of Satipo in Peru. Six soldiers were injured in the shooting.
 21 December 2020 – One Navy servicemen is killed and 3 others are wounded by Shining Path fire while they were patrolling on 3 River Hovercraft at the River Ene in Junín.
23 May 2021 – 18 people are killed in a mass shooting by the MPCP in San Miguel del Ene.
11 February 2023 - Seven police officers are killed, and another is injured when their vehicle is ambushed in VRAEM region, in a suspected attack by remnants of Shining Path.
13 March 2023 - One soldier is killed in a clash with remnants of the Shining Path in an area known as Quebrada Eloy, in the district of Vizcatán del Ene, Junin region.

Notes

References

External links

 Truth and Reconciliation Commission
 International Center for Transitional Justice, Peru

Conflicts in 1980
Peru
Communist rebellions
Communism-based civil wars
 
Peru
Military history of Peru
Peru
Terrorism in Peru
1980s conflicts
1990s conflicts
2000s conflicts
2010s conflicts
2020s conflicts